Eupithecia subtacincta is a moth in the family Geometridae. It is found in the Himalaya, from Jammu and Kashmir through China to the Russian Far East, Korea and Japan. It is also found from south-east Asia to Borneo.

The wingspan is about 12–15 mm. The ground colour of the fore- and hindwings is brownish grey with a greenish tinge.

Larvae have been reared on Clematis species and have also been reported feeding on Cornus controversa.

References

Moths described in 1895
subtacincta
Moths of Asia